Wangamong is a locality in New South Wales.

Transport 
It lies on the Oaklands railway line, Victoria which is a broad gauge branch operated by Victorian Railways.  The station has a wheat silo which is its main reason for being.

References 

 Wangamong Photos 

Towns in the Riverina